The 1999 Wake Forest Demon Deacons football team was an American football team that represented Wake Forest University during the 1999 NCAA Division I-A football season. In their seventh season under head coach Jim Caldwell, the Demon Deacons compiled a 7–5 record, finished in a three-way tie for fifth place in the Atlantic Coast Conference, and defeated Arizona State in the 1999 Aloha Bowl.

Schedule

Roster

Team leaders

References

Wake Forest
Wake Forest Demon Deacons football seasons
Aloha Bowl champion seasons
Wake Forest Demon Deacons football